Delilah Montoya (born December 10, 1955) is a contemporary artist and educator who was born in Fort Worth, Texas and was raised in Omaha, Nebraska by her Anglo-American father and Latina mother. She earned her BA, MA and MFA from the University of New Mexico. Her art is noted for its exploration of Chicana identity and for innovative printmaking and photographic processes.  She is also noted for her use of mixed-media installations and often incorporates iconic religious symbols in her pieces.  Montoya divides her time between Albuquerque and Houston. She taught at the University of New Mexico, Institute of American Indian Arts and California State University before accepting her current position at the University of Houston. She was a 2008 Artadia awardee.

Art
Montoya's work from the 1990s is noted for its exploration of spirituality through the use of Catholic iconography and Mesoamerican folklore images such as the Sacred Heart, Virgin of Guadalupe, La Llorona and Doña Sebastiana. More recent works have explored migration across the US-Mexico border. For example, Montoya’s mixed media installation Sed: The Trail of Thirst (2004-2008) focuses on the absence of people in the desert landscape.  The piece depicts the hardships migrants face while crossing the border.  The art piece incorporates photographs, videos, digital prints as well as actual objects found left behind along the US-Mexico border.   Sed: The Trail of Thirst pays homage to bravery of individuals who have perished while traveling along the border.

Montoya’s well-known installation titled La Guadalupana (1998) incorporates the religious icon the Virgen de Guadalupe.  In the mixed media installation, the centerpiece is a black and white photograph of a shirtless hand-cuffed man named Felix Martínez who has his back towards viewers revealing a vibrant tattoo of the Virgin.  The centerpiece is surrounded by colored photographs of other tattoos of the Virgin on different individuals.  The piece also incorporates an altar at the base of the centerpiece which includes a blanket, roses, candles and rosaries.  The art piece critiques prisons and the treatment of Latinos by law enforcement.  The depiction of the Virgin in the installation helps viewers infer the nationality of the subject in the centerpiece.

Notable group exhibitions include Chicano Art: Resistance and Affirmation, From the West :Chicano Narrative Photography, Arte Latino: Treasures from the Smithsonian American Art Museum and Common Ground: Discovering Community in 150 Years of Art.

Another notable exhibition and book is, Women Boxers: The New Warriors (2006) which challenges traditional gender roles by depicting female professional boxers.  A portrait photograph in Women Boxers titled “Terri ‘Lil Loca’ Lynn Cruz,” depicts Terri Lynn Cruz with her arms crossed revealing her tattoos standing in front of the Sky Ute Casino in Colorado.  Cruz is depicted as a female hero in the portrait in defiance against the oppression of women in society.  In Women Boxers, Montoya depicts the multifaceted nature of her female subjects.

Public collections
 Smithsonian American Art Museum
 Los Angeles County Museum of Art 
 New Mexico Museum of Art
 Mexican Museum (San Francisco)
 The Bronx Museum of the Arts
 Museum of Fine Arts Houston

References

1955 births
Living people
People from Fort Worth, Texas
University of New Mexico alumni
University of Houston faculty
Southwestern artists
Hispanic and Latino American women in the arts
Photographers from Texas
Artists from Omaha, Nebraska
Photographers from Nebraska
20th-century American photographers
21st-century American photographers
20th-century American women photographers
21st-century American women photographers
American women academics